The Amethyst Initiative is an organization made up of U.S. college presidents and chancellors that, in July 2008, launched a movement calling for the reconsideration of U.S. legal drinking age, particularly the minimum age of 21.

The National Minimum Drinking Age Act of 1984 requires all US states to raise their minimum age for purchase and public possession of alcohol to 21 or face a reduction in highway funds under the Federal-Aid Highway Act.

Background 
The Amethyst Initiative was initiated by John McCardell, founder of Choose Responsibility, a former professor of history at Middlebury College in Middlebury, Vermont and current Vice-Chancellor of Sewanee: The University of the South, and is currently supported by 136 college presidents who signed a statement proclaiming, "It’s time to rethink the drinking age".

The idea of the organization's name came from a Greek and Roman legend, that amethysts protected their owners from drunkenness.

Purpose
The Amethyst Initiative states that, in their experience as university presidents, they have observed, "Alcohol education that mandates abstinence as the only legal option has not resulted in significant constructive behavioral change among our students," and therefore they urge lawmakers "to invite new ideas about the best ways to prepare young adults to make responsible decisions about alcohol".

Gustavus Adolphus College President Jack R. Ohle said in a statement that the initiative is not about lowering the drinking age, but to open a debate on alcohol policies that affect young people and their choices about alcohol use.

Statement 
The Amethyst Initiative states the following:

Signatories
Signatories of the initiative include:

President Vincent Maniaci, American International College
President Jerry M. Greiner, Arcadia University
President Ronald Slepitza, Avila University
President Elizabeth Coleman, Bennington College
President Scott D. Miller, Bethany College
President Bobby Fong, Butler University
President Jerry Wallace Campbell University
President David Wolk, Castleton State College
President Mark J. Tierno, Cazenovia College
President Carmen Twillie Ambar, Cedar Crest College
President James L. Doti, Chapman University
President Esther L. Barazzone, Chatham University
Interim President Frank G. Pogue, Chicago State University
President John Bassett, Clark University
President Anthony G. Collins, Clarkson University
President James R. Phifer, Coe College
President Rebecca S. Chopp, Colgate University
President Robert Hoover, College of Idaho
President Mary Pat Seurkamp, College of Notre Dame of Maryland
President Frank Miglorie, College of St. Joseph
President Richard F. Celeste, Colorado College
President Dennison W. Griffith, Columbus College of Art & Design
President James E. Wright, Dartmouth College
President G.T. Smith, Davis and Elkins College
President Brian W. Casey, DePauw University
President William G. Durden, Dickinson College
President Joseph R. Fink, Dominican University of California
President Richard Brodhead, Duke University
President Donald R. Eastman III, Eckerd College
President Theodore Long, Elizabethtown College
President Thomas Meier, Elmira College
President Jacqueline Liebergott, Emerson College
President Richard E. Wylie, Endicott College
President Jeffrey Von Arx, Fairfield University
President Judith L. Kuipers, Fielding Institute
President Janet Morgan Riggs, Gettysburg College
President Mark Scheinberg, Goodwin College
President Sanford J. Ungar, Goucher College
President Jack Ohle, Gustavus Adolphus College
President Joan Hinde Stewart, Hamilton College
President Walter M. Bortz, Hampden-Sydney College
President Ralph J. Hexter, Hampshire College
President Susan DeWine, Hanover College
President Nancy O. Gray, Hollins University
President Richard Gilman, C.S.C., Holy Cross College
President William Brody, Johns Hopkins University
President John J. Bowen, Johnson & Wales University
President Barbara Murphy, Johnson State College
Chancellor Leon Richards, Kapiolani Community College
President S. Georgia Nugent, Kenyon College
President Rev. Thomas J. O'Hara, King's College
President Daniel H. Weiss, Lafayette College
President Stephen D. Schutt, Lake Forest College
President Thomas J. Hochstettler, Lewis & Clark College
President James E. Collins, Loras College
President Carol Moore, Lyndon State College
President Leonard Tyler, Maine Maritime Academy
President Thomas J. Scanlan, F.S.C., Manhattan College
President Richard Berman, Manhattanville College
President Ghazi Darkazalli, Marian Court College
President Tim Foster, Mesa State College
President Stephen M. Jordan, Metropolitan State College of Denver
President Ronald Liebowitz, Middlebury College
President Frances Lucas, Millsaps College
President Mary Ellen Jukoski, Mitchell College
President Susan Cole, Montclair State University
President Christopher Thomforde, Moravian College
President John Reynders, Morningside College
President Joanne V. Creighton, Mount Holyoke College
President Peyton R. Helm, Muhlenberg College
President Randy Dunn, Murray State University
President Thomas B. Coburn, Naropa University
President Fran Voigt, New England Culinary Institute
President Debra Townsley, Nichols College
President Robert A. Skotheim, Occidental College
President Lawrence Schall, Oglethorpe University
President E. Gordon Gee, Ohio State University
President Bonnie Laing-Malcolmson, Oregon College of Art & Craft
President Loren J. Anderson, Pacific Lutheran University
President Phil Creighton, Pacific University
President John Mills, Paul Smith's College
President David W. Oxtoby, Pomona College
President Robert A. Gervasi, Quincy University
President Robert R. Lindgren, Randolph-Macon College
President William E. Troutt, Rhodes College
President David C. Joyce, Ripon College
President Gregory Dell'Omo, Robert Morris University
President Charles R. Middleton, Roosevelt University
President Eric R. Gilbertson, Saginaw Valley State University
President Timothy R. Lannon, Saint Joseph's University (PA)
President Arthur F. Kirk, Saint Leo University
President Patricia Maguire Meservey, Salem State College
President Paul L. Locatelli, S.J., Santa Clara University
President Joel L. Cunningham, Sewanee: University of the South
President Carol T. Christ, Smith College
President Paul LeBlanc, Southern New Hampshire University
President Beverly Daniel Tatum, Spelman College
President Robert E. Ritschel, Spoon River College
President Pamela Trotman Reid, Saint Joseph College (Connecticut)
President Daniel F. Sullivan, St. Lawrence University
President Harold J. Raveche, Stevens Institute of Technology
President Thomas Schwarz, SUNY College at Purchase
President L. Jay Lemons, Susquehanna University
President Elisabeth S. Muhlenfeld, Sweet Briar College
Chancellor Nancy Cantor, Syracuse University
President J. Patrick O'Brien, Texas A&M University, West Texas
President Robert Caret, Towson University
President James F. Jones, Jr., Trinity College
President John M. Stamm, Trinity Lutheran College
President Lawrence S. Bacow, Tufts University
President Thomas P. Rosandich, United States Sports Academy
President Walter Harrison, University of Hartford
President Jennifer Hunter-Cevera, University of Maryland Biotechnology Institute
President C.D. Mote Jr., University of Maryland, College Park
President Jack M. Wilson, University of Massachusetts
Chancellor Robert C. Holub, University of Massachusetts Amherst
President George M. Dennison, University of Montana - Missoula
President Steven H. Kaplan, University of New Haven
President Louis J. Agnese Jr., University of the Incarnate Word
Chancellor John P. Keating, University of Wisconsin, Parkside
Chancellor William E. Kirwan, University System of Maryland
President Geoffrey Shields, Vermont Law School
Chancellor Robert Clarke, Vermont State Colleges
President Ty J. Handy, Vermont Technical College
President Charles W. Steger, Virginia Tech
President Cleveland L. Sellers Jr., Voorhees College
President William E. Hamm, Wartburg College
President Tori Haring-Smith, Washington & Jefferson College
President Kenneth P. Ruscio, Washington & Lee University
President L. Baird Tipson, Washington College
President Michael Bassis, Westminster College of Salt Lake City
President Ronald A. Crutcher, Wheaton College (MA)
President Sharon D. Herzberger, Whittier College
President James T. Harris, Widener University
President M. Lee Pelton, Willamette University
President Lorna Duphiney Edmundson, Wilson College

Public reaction
The initiative's proposal has been criticized by several groups and government and industry officials, including Mothers Against Drunk Driving (MADD). Joining MADD's criticism are other groups, including the Insurance Institute for Highway Safety, the American Medical Association, and the National Transportation Safety Board. A spokesman for the Governors Highway Safety Association told The Washington Post that university leaders "are really just punting on the issue and leaving the high school principals to deal with it." However, Amethyst Initiative's parent organization, Choose Responsibility, proposes that only high school graduates should be eligible.

In a press release, MADD argues that lowering the drinking age would result in greater numbers of fatal automobile accidents, and that the presidents are "looking for an easy way out of an inconvenient problem" and "misrepresenting science." MADD cited former U.S. Department of Health and Human Services Secretary, and current University of Miami president Donna Shalala statement that "maintaining the legal drinking age at 21 is a socially and medically sound policy that helps parents, schools and law enforcement protect our youth from the potentially life-threatening effects of underage drinking."

In addition, MADD debates that: "minimum drinking ages have saved approximately 25,000 lives", "[l]owering the age will cause even younger people to begin drinking", and that "[b]inge drinking on college campuses should be combated with stricter enforcement of current laws."

Choose Responsibility argues that scientific evidence supports the Amethyst Initiative's views and goals, and refutes some of MADD's past claims. Sanford Ungar, president of Goucher College and signee of the initiative argues that opponents should not fear because the Amethyst Initiative is about opening up the debate to improve alcohol policy. He brings about the misconception that they want to "polarize" the issue at hand, but instead wishes to find a better alternative to the current drinking age.

Radley Balko, of Reason, wryly noted inconsistency in opponents' arguments and supporting evidence against the Amethyst Initiative in that they believe that it "would be a "national tragedy" to, for example, allow 19- and 20-year-old men and women returning from Iraq and Afghanistan to have a beer in celebration of completing their tours of duty." Balko, also, noting research showing that underage drinking laws had not reduced highway deaths.

In November 2008, the Student Senate at the University of Wisconsin–La Crosse rejected a proposal to urge that university's chancellor to sign the Amethyst Initiative. Supposedly the first such attempt by a student body to ask a president or chancellor to sign on, the measure at UW–L was defeated 14–19 after three weeks' debate. Chancellor Joe Gow said this vote, "certainly defies the 'conventional wisdom' regarding young people being eager to lower the drinking age."

In 2014, a pair of researchers published a literature review in Journal of Studies on Alcohol and Drugs of studies on the effect of the drinking age in response to the Amethyst Initiative; the review indicates support for the drinking age remaining at 21. That review, however, was specific to studies focused on the United States of America and comparing trends before and after 1984; based on World Health Organization (WHO) data from 2011 and 2014, foreign countries with lesser drinking ages often have fewer alcohol-related deaths per capita annually than the USA.

See also
Alcohol consumption by youth in the United States
Legal drinking age
Choose Responsibility
Young adult (psychology)
Youth development
Adolescent psychology
Age of accountability

References

External links
Official Amethyst Initiative website
List of Signatories
"Amethyst Initiative unites educators in quest to lower drinking age", Chicago Tribune, August 22, 2008
"BSU not interested in age 18 alcohol sales", Indianapolis Star, August 20, 2008
"UNC system waiting to decide on Amethyst Initiative", The Technician, August 22, 2008
"2 Withdraw From Petition to Rethink Drinking Age", The New York Times, August 21, 2008
"College leaders hope to renew debate on a lower drinking age", Los Angeles Times, August 20, 2008
"Bid to reconsider drinking age taps unlikely source", The Wall Street Journal'', August 21, 2008

Drinking culture
Adolescence
Non-profit organizations based in Washington, D.C.
Youth rights in the United States
Alcohol law in the United States
2008 establishments in the United States
Organizations established in 2008
Age and society
Alcohol abuse in the United States
Legal drinking age